The 1920–21 season was the 23rd in the history of the Southern League. The league was split into two sections, one for English clubs and one for Welsh clubs. The previous season had seen all Division One clubs elected to the Football League to form the new Third Division, leaving ten of the eleven clubs from Division Two (Caerphilly, who had finished bottom of Division Two, had resigned from the league) as the sole remaining members, all of which were from Wales. As a result, the league admitted thirteen new clubs from England (nine of which were reserve teams) and one from Wales (Aberdare Athletic).

Brighton & Hove Albion reserves won the English section, whilst Barry won the Welsh section. Brighton reserves were declared Southern League champions after defeating Barry in a championship play-off; after a 1–1 draw at Millwall's Den stadium, Brighton beat Barry 2–1 after eighty minutes of extra-time in a replay at Cardiff City's Ninian Park.

Alongside Barry, five other Southern League clubs applied for election to the two places in Division Three South of the Football League. Welsh Section runners-up Aberdare Athletic and the English Section's eighth-placed club Charlton Athletic won the most votes and joined the League the following season.

English section

All thirteen clubs in the English section were new to the league.

Welsh section

A total of 11 teams contest the division, including ten sides from previous season and one new team.

Newly elected teams:
 Aberdare Athletic

Football League election
As Grimsby Town had been transferred from Division Three (which was to become Division Three South) to the new Division Three North, Crystal Palace had been promoted to Division Two, and no teams had been relegated from Division Two to the new Division Three South, there were two vacancies in the newly renamed division. The Arsenal representative at the Football League meeting proposed that the bottom two clubs in Division Three the previous season (Brentford and Gillingham) be re-elected automatically, a decision that was approved with only one representative against.

In total, eight non-League clubs applied, six from the Southern League, one from the Western League and one from the Welsh National League (South). Aberdare Athletic and Charlton Athletic were successful, and joined the Football League the following season.

References

1920-21
1920–21 in English football leagues
1920–21 in Welsh football